The Beretta AL390  is a semi-automatic shotgun first listed in the 1992 Beretta catalogue. The shotgun features a self compensating gas operating system and a 12 gauge barrel.

The field model features anodized light alloy receiver, scroll engraving, a matte black receiver top, and a walnut finish on the stock. The gun is typically used by hunting enthusiasts. 

The AL390 came in five extra variants. These include the: Sporting variant, 20 gauge sporting variant, 20 gauge youth edition sporting, and a gold sporting variant.

References 

Beretta firearms
Semi-automatic shotguns of Italy